Leonard Vincent "Bill" Hattaway is a New Zealand former professional rugby league footballer who played in the 1950s and 1960s.

Playing career
Hattaway played for Otahuhu in the Auckland Rugby League competition and also represented Auckland. On 13 September 1958 he was part of the Otahuhu side that played in the first-ever Auckland Rugby League grand final, losing 9–13 to Ponsonby.

In 1959 he was selected for the New Zealand national rugby league team squad that toured Australia. He became Kiwi #392; however, he did not play in any test matches on tour.

In 1960 he played for New Zealand Māori against the touring French side.

References

Auckland rugby league team players
New Zealand Māori rugby league team players
New Zealand national rugby league team players
New Zealand rugby league players
Otahuhu Leopards players
Possibly living people
Rugby league second-rows
Year of birth missing (living people)